Benjamin "Bugsy" Siegel (February 28, 1906 – June 20, 1947) was an American mobster who was a driving force behind the development of the Las Vegas Strip. Siegel was not only influential within the Jewish Mob, but along with his childhood friend and fellow gangster Meyer Lansky, also held significant influence within the Italian-American Mafia and the largely Italian-Jewish National Crime Syndicate. Described as handsome and charismatic, he became one of the first front-page celebrity gangsters.

Siegel was one of the founders and leaders of Murder, Inc. and became a bootlegger during Prohibition. After the Twenty-first Amendment was passed repealing Prohibition in 1933, he turned to gambling. In 1936, he left New York and moved to California. His time as a mobster during this period was mainly as a hitman and muscle, as he was noted for his prowess with guns and violence. In 1941, Siegel was tried for the murder of friend and fellow mobster Harry Greenberg, who had turned informant. He was acquitted in 1942.

Siegel traveled to Las Vegas, Nevada, where he handled and financed some of the original casinos. He assisted developer William R. Wilkerson's Flamingo Hotel after Wilkerson ran out of funds. Siegel assumed control of the project and managed the final stages of construction. The Flamingo opened on December 26, 1946, in a driving rainstorm, resulting in a poor reception and technical difficulties, and soon closed. It reopened in March 1947 with a finished hotel, but by then his mob partners were convinced an estimated $1 million of the construction budget overage had been skimmed by either girlfriend Virginia Hill, Siegel or both. On June 20, 1947, Siegel was shot dead by a sniper through the window of Hill's Linden Drive mansion in Beverly Hills, California.

Early life
Benjamin Siegel was born on February 28, 1906, in the Williamsburg neighborhood of Brooklyn in New York City, New York, the second of five children of a poor Ashkenazi Jewish family that emigrated to the U.S. from the Galicia region of what was then Austria-Hungary. His parents, Jennie (Riechenthal) and Max Siegel, constantly worked for meager wages. As a boy, Siegel left school and joined a gang on Lafayette Street on the Lower East Side of Manhattan. He committed mainly thefts until he met Moe Sedway. Together with Sedway, he developed a protection racket in which he threatened to incinerate pushcart owners' merchandise unless they paid him a dollar. He soon built up a lengthy criminal record, dating from his teenage years, that included armed robbery, rape and murder.

The Bugs and Meyer mob

During adolescence, Siegel befriended Meyer Lansky, who applied a brilliant intellect to forming a small mob whose activities expanded to gambling and car theft. Lansky, who had already had a run-in with Charles "Lucky" Luciano, saw a need for the Jewish boys of his Brooklyn neighborhood to organize in the same manner as the Italians and Irish. The first person he recruited for his gang was Siegel.

He became involved in bootlegging within several major East Coast cities. He also worked as the mob's hitman, whom Lansky hired out to other crime families. The two formed the Bugs and Meyer Mob, which handled hits for the various bootleg gangs operating in New York and New Jersey, doing so almost a decade before Murder, Inc. was formed. The gang kept themselves busy by hijacking the liquor cargoes of rival outfits, and were known to be responsible for the killing and removal of several rival gangland figures. Siegel's gang-mates included Abner "Longie" Zwillman, Louis "Lepke" Buchalter, and Lansky's brother, Jake; Joseph "Doc" Stacher, another member of the Bugs and Meyer Mob, recalled to Lansky biographers that Siegel was fearless and saved his friends' lives as the mob moved into bootlegging:

Siegel was also a boyhood friend to Al Capone; when there was a warrant for Capone's arrest on a murder charge, Siegel allowed him to hide out with an aunt.

He first smoked opium during his youth and was involved in the drug trade. By age 21, he was making money, and flaunted it. He bought an apartment at the Waldorf Astoria Hotel and a Tudor home in Scarsdale, New York. He wore flashy clothes and participated in New York City night life.

From May 13 to 16, 1929, Lansky and Siegel attended the Atlantic City Conference, representing the Bugs and Meyer Mob. Luciano and former Chicago South Side Gang leader Johnny Torrio held the conference at the Ritz-Carlton Hotel in Atlantic City, New Jersey. At the conference, the two men discussed the future of organized crime and the future structure of the Mafia crime families; Siegel stated, "The yids and the dagos will no longer fight each other."

Marriage and family
On January 28, 1929, Siegel married Esta Krakower, his childhood sweetheart. They had two daughters, Millicent Siegel (later Millicent Rosen) and Barbara Siegel (later Barbara Saperstein). He had a reputation as a womanizer and the marriage ended in 1946. His wife moved with their teenage daughters to New York.

Murder, Incorporated
By the late 1920s, Lansky and Siegel had ties to Luciano and Frank Costello, future bosses of the Genovese crime family. Siegel, Albert Anastasia, Vito Genovese, and Joe Adonis allegedly were the four gunmen who shot New York mob boss Joe Masseria to death on Luciano's orders on April 15, 1931, ending the Castellammarese War. On September 10 of that year, Luciano hired four gunmen from the Bugs and Meyer Mob (some sources identify Siegel as being one of the gunmen) to murder Salvatore Maranzano in his New York office, establishing Luciano's rise to the top of the Mafia and marking the beginning of modern American organized crime.

Following Maranzano's death, Luciano and Lansky formed the National Crime Syndicate, an organization of crime families that brought power to the underworld. The Commission was established for dividing Mafia territories and preventing future gang wars. With his associates, Siegel formed Murder, Inc. After he and Lansky moved on, control over Murder, Inc. was ceded to Buchalter and Anastasia, although Siegel continued working as a hitman. Siegel's only conviction was in Miami; on February 28, 1932, he was arrested for gambling and vagrancy, and, from a roll of bills, paid a $100 fine.

During this period, Siegel had a disagreement with the Fabrizzo brothers, associates of Waxey Gordon. Gordon had hired the Fabrizzo brothers from prison after Lansky and Siegel gave the IRS information about Gordon's tax evasion. It led to Gordon's imprisonment in 1933. Siegel hunted down and killed the Fabrizzos after they made an assassination attempt on him and Lansky, penetrating Siegel's heavily fortified Waldorf Astoria suite with a bomb. After the deaths of his two brothers, Tony Fabrizzo had begun to write a memoir and gave it to an attorney. One of the longest chapters was to be a section on the nationwide kill-for-hire squad led by Siegel. However, the mob discovered Fabrizzo's plans before he could execute them. In 1932, after checking into a hospital to establish an alibi and later sneaking out, Siegel joined two accomplices in approaching Fabrizzo's house and, posing as detectives to lure him outside, gunned him down. In 1935, Siegel assisted in Luciano's alliance with Dutch Schultz and killed rival loan sharks Louis "Pretty" Amberg and Joseph C. Amberg.

California
Siegel had learned from his associates that he was in danger: his hospital alibi had become questionable and his enemies wanted him dead. In the late 1930s, the East Coast mob sent Siegel to California. Since 1933, he had traveled to the West Coast several times, and in California his mission was to develop syndicate-sanctioned gambling rackets with Los Angeles family boss Jack Dragna. Once in Los Angeles, Siegel recruited gang boss Mickey Cohen as his chief lieutenant. Knowing Siegel's reputation for violence, and that he was backed by Lansky and Luciano – who, from prison, sent word to Dragna that it was "in [his] best interest to cooperate" – Dragna accepted a subordinate role. On tax returns, Siegel claimed to earn his living through legal gambling at Santa Anita Park. He soon took over Los Angeles's numbers racket and used money from the syndicate to help establish a drug trade route from Mexico and organized circuits with the Chicago Outfit's wire services.

By 1942, US$500,000 a day was coming from the syndicate's bookmaking wire operations. In 1946, because of problems with Siegel, the Outfit took over the Continental Press and gave the percentage of the racing wire to Dragna, infuriating Siegel. Despite his complications with the wire services, Siegel controlled several offshore casinos and a major prostitution ring. He also maintained relationships with politicians, businessmen, attorneys, accountants, and lobbyists who fronted for him.

Hollywood
In Hollywood, Siegel was welcomed in the highest circles and befriended movie stars. He was known to associate with George Raft, Clark Gable, Gary Cooper and Cary Grant, as well as studio executives Louis B. Mayer and Jack L. Warner. Actress Jean Harlow was a friend of Siegel and godmother to his daughter Millicent. Siegel bought real estate and threw lavish parties at his Beverly Hills home. He gained admiration from young celebrities, including Tony Curtis, Phil Silvers, and Frank Sinatra.

Siegel had several relationships with prominent women, including socialite Countess Dorothy di Frasso. The alliance with the countess took Siegel to Italy in 1938, where he met Benito Mussolini, to whom Siegel tried to sell weapons. Siegel also met Nazi leaders Hermann Göring and Joseph Goebbels, to whom he took an instant dislike and later offered to kill. He only relented because of the countess's anxious pleas.

In Hollywood, Siegel worked with the syndicate to form illegal rackets. He devised a plan of extorting movie studios; he would take over local trade unions (such as the Screen Extras Guild and the Los Angeles Teamsters) and stage strikes to force studios to pay him off so that unions would start working again. Siegel borrowed money from celebrities and did not pay them back, knowing that they would never ask him for the money. During his first year in Hollywood, he received more than US$400,000 in loans from movie stars.

Selling Atomite to Mussolini
Atomite, according to Siegel's accounts, was a new type of explosive substance that detonated without sound or flash. Bugsy Siegel attracted the interest of Benito Mussolini and the Axis powers to purchase atomite. Mussolini advanced $40,000 to have atomite scaled up, but in 1939, during a demonstration to Mussolini and Nazi leaders, including Joseph Goebbels and Hermann Göring, Siegel failed to detonate the explosive and Mussolini demanded the return of his money.

Greenberg murder and trial
On November 22, 1939, Siegel, Whitey Krakower, Frankie Carbo and Albert Tannenbaum killed Harry "Big Greenie" Greenberg outside his apartment. Greenberg had threatened to become a police informant, and Buchalter ordered his killing. Tannenbaum confessed to the murder and agreed to testify against Siegel. Siegel was implicated in the murder, and in September 1941, was put on trial. The trial soon gained notoriety because of the preferential treatment Siegel received in jail; he refused to eat prison food, was allowed female visitors, and was granted leave for dental visits. Siegel hired attorney Jerry Giesler for his defense. After the deaths of two state witnesses, no additional witnesses came forward. Tannenbaum's testimony was dismissed. In 1942, Siegel was acquitted because of insufficient evidence but his reputation was damaged.

During the trial, newspapers revealed Siegel's past and referred to him as "Bugsy." Siegel hated the nickname (said to be based on the slang term "bugs", meaning "crazy", used to describe his erratic behavior), preferring to be called "Ben" or "Mr. Siegel". On May 25, 1944, Siegel was arrested for bookmaking. Raft and Mack Gray testified on Siegel's behalf, and in late 1944, Siegel was acquitted again.

Las Vegas
In 1946, Siegel found an opportunity to reinvent his personal image and diversify into legitimate business with William R. Wilkerson's Flamingo Hotel. In the 1930s, Siegel had traveled to southern Nevada with Sedway to explore expanding operations there. He had found opportunities in providing illicit services to crews constructing the Boulder Dam. Lansky had handed over operations in Nevada to Siegel, who turned it over to Sedway and left for Hollywood.

In the mid-1940s, Siegel was lining things up in Las Vegas while his lieutenants worked on a business policy to secure all gambling in Los Angeles. In May 1946, he decided that the agreement with Wilkerson had to be altered to give him control of the Flamingo. With the Flamingo, Siegel would supply the gambling, the best liquor and food, and the biggest entertainers at reasonable prices. He believed that these attractions would lure not only the high rollers but thousands of vacationers willing to gamble $50 or $100. Wilkerson was eventually coerced into selling all stakes in the Flamingo under the threat of death and went into hiding in Paris for a time. From this point the Flamingo became syndicate-run.

Las Vegas' beginning
Siegel began a spending spree. He demanded the finest building that money could buy at a time of postwar shortages. As costs soared, his checks began bouncing. By October 1946, the Flamingo's costs were above US$4 million. By 1947, the costs were over US$6 million (equivalent to $ million in ). By late November of that year, the work was nearly finished.

According to later reports by local observers, Siegel's "maniacal chest-puffing" set the pattern for several generations of notable casino moguls. His violent reputation did not help his situation. After he boasted one day that he had personally killed some men, Siegel saw the panicked look on the face of head contractor Del Webb and reassured him: "Del, don't worry, we only kill each other." Other associates portrayed Siegel in a different aspect; he was an intense character who was not without a charitable side, including his donations for the Damon Runyon Cancer Fund. Lou Wiener Jr., Siegel's Las Vegas attorney, described him as "very well liked" and said that he was "good to people."

Defiance and devastation
Problems with the Outfit's wire service had cleared up in Nevada and Arizona, but in California, Siegel refused to report business. He later announced to his colleagues that he was running the California syndicate by himself and that he would return the loans in his "own good time." Despite Siegel's defiance to the mob bosses, they were patient with him because he had always proven to be a valuable man.

The Flamingo opened on December 26, 1946, at which time only the casino, lounge, theater, and restaurant were finished. Although local people attended the opening, few celebrities did. A handful drove in from Los Angeles, despite bad weather. Some celebrities present were Raft, June Haver, Vivian Blaine, Sonny Tufts, Brian Donlevy, and Charles Coburn. They were welcomed by construction noise and a lobby draped with drop cloths. The desert's first air conditioning system broke down regularly. While gambling tables were operating, the luxury rooms that would have served as the lure for people to stay and gamble were not ready. As word of losses made their way to Siegel during the evening, he began to become irate and verbally abusive, throwing out at least one family. After two weeks, the Flamingo's gaming tables were $275,000 in the red and the entire operation shut down in late January 1947.

After being granted a second chance, Siegel knuckled down and did everything possible to turn the Flamingo into a success by making renovations and obtaining good press. He hired future newsman Hank Greenspun as a publicist. The hotel reopened on March 1, 1947—with Lansky present—and began turning a profit. However, by the time profits began improving, the mob bosses above Siegel were tired of waiting. Although time was running out, at age 41, Siegel had carved out a name for himself in the annals of organized crime and in Las Vegas history.

Death

On the night of June 20, 1947, as Siegel sat with his associate Allen Smiley in Virginia Hill's Beverly Hills home reading the Los Angeles Times, an unknown assailant fired at him through the window with a .30 caliber military M1 carbine, hitting him many times, including twice in the head. Some looked upon it as a cowardly approach, bushwhacking the formidable and weapons-proficient Siegel from a distance. No one was charged with killing Siegel, and the crime remains officially unsolved.

One theory is that Siegel's death was due to his excessive spending and possible theft of money from the mob. In 1946, a meeting was held with the "board of directors" of the syndicate in Havana, Cuba so that Luciano, exiled in Sicily, could attend and participate. A contract on Siegel's life was the conclusion. According to Stacher, Lansky reluctantly agreed to the decision. Another theory is that Siegel was shot to death preemptively by Mathew "Moose" Pandza, the lover of Sedway's wife Bee, who went to Pandza after learning that Siegel was threatening to kill her husband. Siegel apparently had grown increasingly resentful of the control Sedway, at mob behest, was exerting over Siegel's finances and planned to do away with him. Former Philadelphia family boss Ralph Natale claimed that Carbo was responsible for murdering Siegel, at the behest of Lansky.

Siegel's death certificate states the cause of death as homicide and the immediate cause as "Cerebral Hemorrage due to Gunshot Wounds of the Head." Siegel was hit by several other bullets, including shots through his lungs. According to Florabel Muir, "Four of the nine shots fired that night destroyed a white marble statue of Bacchus on a grand piano, and then lodged in the far wall."

The day after Siegel's death, the Los Angeles Herald-Express carried a photograph on its front page from the morgue of Siegel's bare right foot with a toe tag. Although Siegel's murder occurred in Beverly Hills, his death thrust Las Vegas into the national spotlight as photographs of his lifeless body were published in newspapers throughout the country. The day after Siegel's murder, David Berman and his Las Vegas mob associates, Sedway and Gus Greenbaum, walked into the Flamingo and took over operation of the hotel and casino.

Memorial

In the Bialystoker Synagogue on New York's Lower East Side, Siegel is memorialized by a Yahrtzeit (remembrance) plaque that marks his death date so mourners can say Kaddish for the anniversary. Siegel's plaque is below that of Max Siegel, his father, who died just two months before his son. On the property at the Flamingo Las Vegas, between the pool and a wedding chapel, is a memorial plaque to Siegel.

Media portrayals
 Morris "Moe" Greene is a fictional character appearing in Mario Puzo's 1969 novel The Godfather and the 1972 film of the same name. Both Greene's character and personality are based on Bugsy Siegel.
 The 1991 motion picture drama Mobsters, depicting the rise of The Commission, focused on the empire built by enterprising young criminals Lucky Luciano (Christian Slater), Meyer Lansky (Patrick Dempsey), and Bugsy Siegel (Richard Grieco).
 A character going by the same name, portrayed by Edwin Richfield, appears in the sixth episode of the second series of the 1960s cult British spy-fi TV series The Avengers.
 Bugsy (1991) is a highly fictionalized movie biography of Siegel, featuring Warren Beatty as mobster Benjamin (Bugsy) Siegel.
 The Marrying Man (1991) has Armand Assante playing the role of Siegel.
 Tim Powers imagined Siegel as a modern-day Fisher King in his novel Last Call (1992).
 A biography of Siegel (a 1995 program from the television series Biography) was released on DVD in 2005. 50 minutes, color with b&w sequences. 
 He is portrayed by Michael Zegen in the HBO series Boardwalk Empire.
 He is a central character in Frank Darabont's television series Mob City, portrayed by Edward Burns.
 He is portrayed by Jonathan Stewart in the AMC series The Making of the Mob: New York, a docudrama focusing on the history of the mob with the first season about Charlie "Lucky" Luciano's life story.
 Joe Mantegna portrayed Siegel in the 2015 film Kill Me, Deadly.
 Siegel was mentioned in the song titled 2 of Amerikaz Most Wanted by Tupac Shakur and Snoop Dogg in the album All Eyez On Me. He was mentioned by Snoop Dogg in the fourth verse.
 Jonathan Sadowski portrayed a heavily fictionalized Siegel in the fifth-season episode "Miss Me, Kiss Me, Love Me" of DC's Legends of Tomorrow; a science-fiction series with supernatural overtones, it featured Siegel being resurrected after his assassination, though he is finally terminated in Hell by the character John Constantine.
 David Cade portrays Siegel in the 2021 film Lansky.

See also
 Jewish-American organized crime
 List of unsolved murders

References

Works cited

Further reading

 Almog, Oz et al. Kosher Nostra. Wien: Jüdisches Museum der Stadt Wien, 2003

External links

 FBI files on Siegel (2,421 pages, heavily redacted) From the FBI Freedom of Information Act.
 Benjamin "Bugsy" Siegel Profile and NY Times Article at J-Grit: The Internet Index of Tough Jews
 PBS American Experience
 Bugsy Siegel memorial in Las Vegas
 Bugsy Siegel Article Archives
 Bugsy Siegel Biography
 Bugsy Siegel at the Crime Library
 Digitized photograph from the Lloyd Sealy Library Digital Collections: Identification photograph of Bugsy Siegel and others c.1932 (upper half removed)
   [Official Bugsy Siegel]

1906 births
1947 deaths
1947 murders in the United States
20th-century American businesspeople
20th-century American criminals
American casino industry businesspeople
American crime bosses
American people convicted of murder
American people of Austrian-Jewish descent
American rapists
Burials at Hollywood Forever Cemetery
Deaths by firearm in California
Genovese crime family
History of Clark County, Nevada
Male murder victims
Murder, Inc.
Jewish American gangsters
Murdered Jewish American gangsters
People from Scarsdale, New York
People from Williamsburg, Brooklyn
People murdered in California
Prohibition-era gangsters
Unsolved murders in the United States